Anisopodus is a genus of beetles in the family Cerambycidae, containing the following species:

 Anisopodus acutus Thomson, 1865
 Anisopodus affinis Martins, 1974
 Anisopodus andicola Kirsch, 1889
 Anisopodus arachnoides (Audinet-Serville, 1835)
 Anisopodus batesi Gilmour, 1965
 Anisopodus bellus Martins & Monné, 1974
 Anisopodus brevis Gahan, 1892
 Anisopodus callistus Bates, 1881
 Anisopodus cognatus Bates, 1863
 Anisopodus consimilis Aurivillius, 1922
 Anisopodus conspersus Aurivillius, 1922
 Anisopodus costaricensis Lara & Shenefelt, 1964
 Anisopodus curvilineatus White, 1855
 Anisopodus curvipes Martins, 1974
 Anisopodus degener Bates, 1885
 Anisopodus dispar Bates, 1885
 Anisopodus dominicensis Villiers, 1980
 Anisopodus elongatus Bates, 1863
 Anisopodus gracillimus Bates, 1863
 Anisopodus haliki Martins, 1974
 Anisopodus hamaticollis Bates, 1872
 Anisopodus hiekei Martins, 1974
 Anisopodus humeralis Bates, 1863
 Anisopodus latus Monné & Martins, 1976
 Anisopodus ligneus Bates, 1863
 Anisopodus lignicola Bates, 1863
 Anisopodus longipes Linsley & Chemsak, 1966
 Anisopodus macropus Bates, 1863
 Anisopodus melzeri Gilmour, 1965
 Anisopodus mexicanus Bates, 1881
 Anisopodus nigripes Bates, 1885
 Anisopodus phalangodes (Erichson, 1847)
 Anisopodus prolixus (Erichson, 1847)
 Anisopodus puncticollis Monné & Martins, 1976
 Anisopodus punctipennis Monné & Martins, 1976
 Anisopodus scriptipennis Bates, 1872
 Anisopodus sparsus Bates, 1863
 Anisopodus strigosus (Erichson, 1847)
 Anisopodus subarmatus Melzer, 1931
 Anisopodus varius Melzer, 1935
 Anisopodus xylinus Bates, 1881

References

 
Acanthocinini